Ognyan Bangiev (born 15 June 1956) is a Bulgarian gymnast. He competed in eight events at the 1980 Summer Olympics.

References

1956 births
Living people
Bulgarian male artistic gymnasts
Olympic gymnasts of Bulgaria
Gymnasts at the 1980 Summer Olympics
Place of birth missing (living people)